Nate Butler is an American songwriter, music producer, vocal producer, and recording artist based in Atlanta, Georgia. He has been a part of 45 plus million records sold worldwide at last count. Butler has worked with multi-platinum artists such as Luther Vandross, Victoria Beckham aka Posh Spice, Houston, Craig David, Backstreet Boys, 3LW, Christina Milian, Stacie Orrico, JoJo, Aaron Carter, The Cheetah Girls and others. Butler launched the career of the platinum R&B group 3LW by writing their hit singles: No More (Baby I'ma Do Right) and Playas Gon' Play. Two of the members of 3LW, Kiely Williams and Adrienne Bailon, went on to become members of the worldwide Disney sensation The Cheetah Girls. Butler also penned the notable chart topping R&B smash single "Afterparty" by Koffee Brown, also referred to as a R&B classic.

Butler helped launch the careers of many artists, such as the American Idols and others such as, S Club 7 (U.K.), L5 (France), Blue (U.K.), Sugababes (U.K.), Miss3 (Norway), BoA (Japan), and Lola (Italy). Butler has racked up credits on blockbuster films such as Barbershop, Four Brothers, 
Dr. Dolittle 2, Save the Last Dance, and the Nickelodeon hit Jimmy Neutron.

Butler was a part of the casting team for the final season of The X-Factor and America's Got Talent Season 9 and 10. 
He worked as the Jr. Casting Producer for Showtime at the Apollo on Fox Entertainment Group hosted by 
Steve Harvey and he is currently casting for the new show The Four: Battle For Stardom with Sean John Combs aka P. Diddy, DJ Khaled, Meghan Trainor, Charlie Walk the President of Universal Republic Records and Fergie which also airs on the Fox Entertainment Group.

Currently he is one of the stars of the television show "Live Your Dream" in South Africa which focuses on bringing hope to those in the entertainment space, by presenting opportunities to be seen and heard by the top executives in the arts and entertainment world. It is currently airing on Via Television Network on DSTV channel 147.

Discography

Film and television placements

Web campaign music and sound design catalogue

References

1981 births
Living people
Record producers from Maryland